Sérgio Eduardo Ferreira da Cunha (born 15 October 1972 in Rio de Janeiro), known as Serginho, is a Brazilian retired footballer who played as a striker.

Club career
After playing in his country mostly for modest clubs – he represented Associação Atlética Portuguesa (RJ), Olaria Atlético Clube, América Football Club, Vitória Futebol Clube (ES) – Serginho moved at almost 22 to Portugal with C.D. Nacional, being an instrumental part in the Madeira side's rise from the third and second divisions, eventually consolidating in the Primeira Liga.

In 2003–04, already slowing down, Serginho still scored two goals in 19 games as Nacional qualified for the first time ever to the UEFA Cup. He then moved to the lower leagues both in his country (Esporte Clube Juventude, Universidade Estácio de Sá Futebol Clube) and Portugal (C.F. União and U.D. Santana), before retiring in 2007 at the age of 35; he was Nacional's all-time top scorer, having netted well over 100 times in competitive matches.

International career
Serginho represented Brazil's under-20s at the 1991 FIFA World Youth Championship in Portugal, but appeared only once for the eventual losing finalists, featuring 15 minutes in the 5–1 quarter-final win against South Korea.

External links

1972 births
Living people
Footballers from Rio de Janeiro (city)
Brazilian footballers
Association football forwards
Campeonato Brasileiro Série A players
Associação Atlética Portuguesa (RJ) players
Olaria Atlético Clube players
America Football Club (RJ) players
Vitória Futebol Clube (ES) players
Esporte Clube Juventude players
Primeira Liga players
Liga Portugal 2 players
Segunda Divisão players
C.D. Nacional players
C.F. União players
Saudi First Division League players
Al-Shoulla FC players
Brazil under-20 international footballers
Brazilian expatriate footballers
Expatriate footballers in Portugal
Expatriate footballers in Saudi Arabia
Brazilian expatriate sportspeople in Portugal
Saudi Professional League players